CIMI may refer to:

 Catalina Island Marine Institute, a marine biology program for youth.
 CIMI-FM, a modern rock radio station in Quebec City, Quebec, Canada.
 Clinical Information Modelling Initiative, a community of interest focused on health care models.
 Cloud Infrastructure Management Interface, an information technology standard for cloud computing.
 Computer Interchange of Museum Information, a museum IT standards consortium.